Peter Robertson was mayor of Brampton, Ontario from 1991 to 2000. In 2000, he was defeated in the municipal election by then-councillor Susan Fennell.

Background
In 1970, Toronto Gore Township considered developing the community of Castlemore into a city of thirty thousand, over a five-year period. The community had the smallest population of any township within Peel, and neighboured Bramalea, a "satellite city" in Chinguacousy Township. The plan was to include developing a portion of the Claireville Conservation Area. Then an education consultant, Robertson spoke out at a public meeting on the plan, expressing concerns about possible changes to the quality of life in the area. As of a July meeting of the Peel Board of Education, Robertson was described as a "spokesman for the Castlemore residents".

Robertson stood for election to be one of the first Peel Regional councillors, in an October 1973 election ahead of Peel's transition from County to Region. Mel Robinson, Reeve of the soon-to-disband Toronto Gore, won with 337 votes, to Robertson's 199 votes, and Stanley Carberry's 68. (Teacher Ken Whillans was elected in that election; Whillans later became mayor, before Robertson.)

Council
At an unlisted point before 1979, Robertson was elected as a Brampton councillor. Among his Peel committees, he chaired a 1980 study for a proposed recycling plant on Bramalea Road in Mississauga. As a member of the Peel District Health Council from at least 1979 on, he was director as of at least 1982. As director, he advocated for community health centres funded by OHIP, similar to a format he toured in San Francisco, where he also toured a wellness clinic. In 1980, Robertson was quoted in the media as defending Kwakiutl, a nude Aboriginal sculpture, disagreeing with Brampton staff advice that the statue's genitalia be shaved off.

In the 1982 election, Robertson's Chinguacousy—Gore regional seat was challenged by Alderman Keith Coutlee; the incumbent won. When asked by the media for an endorsement of who should replace retiring Premier Bill Davis as leader of the Progressive Conservative Party of Ontario, Robertson reserved comment. Robertson ran to become the Progressive Conservative candidate for Brampton, defeated by 25-year-old businessman Jeff Rice on the third ballot. The son of a noted developer, Rice was rumoured favorite of the Tory establishment in Brampton. Dr. Ralph Greene and Nancy Porteous also ran for the nomination. Liberal Bob Callahan would later beat Rice in the traditionally conservative riding.

In the 1985 municipal election, Robertson's Regional seat was challenged by Alderman Mario Annecchini. The challenger suggested that Robertson had collected "too much political baggage", in his 12 years in office. Robertson ran on his record of pushing for sufficient parks and recreation facilities and schools in his ward. At the time, Robertson maintained his position as a professor of education at University of Toronto, and was writing a book on family violence. Robertson won.

He was acclaimed as Regional councillor for Wards 2, 8 and 10 in 1988. In 1990, Robertson was described by the Toronto Star as "one of the driving forces" behind a new race relations committee, set up by the City to inspect the effect of education, employment equity, and housing issues on new immigrants.

1991 mayoral campaign
Paul Beisel, appointed Brampton mayor after the death of Ken Whillans, decided to retire from politics at the end of his term, returning to his position as vice-president of Midland Mortgages. Regional councillors Robertson, Eric Carter, and Frank Russell all stood for election, along with businessmen Alan Austin and Don McMullen.

Mayor

Post mayoral career
In June 2012, Robertson was charged with dangerous operation of a motor vehicle, after striking a pedestrian at 10 Peel Centre Drive, the Region of Peel offices, during a strike by CUPE members. Strikers were aware of his identity as a former Mayor, and stopped him for 27 minutes. Robertson's lawyer says the woman "sat on his car and then fell on the ground."

References

Living people
Mayors of Brampton
Year of birth missing (living people)